Strictly Come Dancing returned for its twentieth series with a launch show on 23 September 2022 on BBC One, with live shows beginning the following day on 24 September. The launch show was originally scheduled to be broadcast on 17 September, but was postponed out of respect following the death of Queen Elizabeth II. Tess Daly and Claudia Winkleman returned as hosts, whilst Rylan Clark and Janette Manrara returned to host Strictly Come Dancing: It Takes Two.

In May 2022, the BBC announced that Craig Revel Horwood, Motsi Mabuse, Shirley Ballas and Anton Du Beke would return to the judging panel. It was also confirmed that Bruno Tonioli, who had been absent from the two previous series due to travel restrictions resulting from the COVID-19 pandemic, would be permanently leaving the show.

In August 2022, the BBC confirmed that the show would return to the Blackpool Tower Ballroom for the first time since the seventeenth series. It was also announced that there would be a special themed week to celebrate the 100th anniversary of the BBC, with the couples dancing to "a theme tune from an iconic BBC programme or in tribute to one of the BBC's most loved services".

The series was won by Hamza Yassin, who became the first winner born outside the United Kingdom, and his professional partner Jowita Przystał. Runners-up were Fleur East and Vito Coppola, Molly Rainford and Carlos Gu, and Helen Skelton and Gorka Márquez. Both Coppola and Gu were in their first season as professionals on the program, and this was Przystał's first season paired with a celebrity.

Professional dancers 
On 22 February 2022, it was announced that Oti Mabuse was to leave the series after seven years, and on 28 March 2022, that Aljaž Škorjanec would be leaving the series after nine years. Three days after Škorjanec's departure, the BBC announced that Dianne Buswell, Nadiya Bychkova, Graziano Di Prima, Amy Dowden, Karen Hauer, Katya Jones, Neil Jones, Nikita Kuzmin, Cameron Lombard, Gorka Márquez, Luba Mushtuk, Giovanni Pernice, Jowita Przystał, Johannes Radebe, Kai Widdrington  and Nancy Xu would be returning to the series.

In July 2022, the BBC announced that four new professional dancers would be joining the sixteen remaining returning pros. These are: European cup winner Vito Coppola who was also a professional dancer on the Italian version of the show in 2021, Chinese National Champion Carlos Gu, former Under 21 British National Champion Lauren Oakley and Latin dance champion Michelle Tsiakkas. Jowita Przystał received a celebrity partner for the first time, as did new professionals Vito Coppola and Carlos Gu, while Neil Jones, Luba Mushtuk, Cameron Lombard and other new professionals Lauren Oakley and Michelle Tsiakkas did not receive a partner.

Couples
On 4 August 2022, the first two celebrities announced to be participating in the series were Will Mellor and Kym Marsh. Celebrity contestants continued to be revealed until 13 August 2022, when the full line-up was announced. During the week 8 results show on 13 November, after initially being announced as one of the bottom two couples, Tony Adams and Katya Jones withdrew from the competition due to Adams sustaining a hamstring injury during their original performance, making it the first time in the show's history a contestant had to withdraw during the show's broadcast.

Scoring chart

Average chart
This table only counts for dances scored on a traditional 40-points scale.

Highest and lowest scoring performances of the series
The highest and lowest performances in each dance according to the judges' scale are as follows.

Couples' highest and lowest scoring dances

Weekly scores and songs
Unless indicated otherwise, individual judges scores in the charts below (given in parentheses) are listed in this order from left to right: Craig Revel Horwood, Motsi Mabuse, Shirley Ballas, Anton Du Beke.

Launch show

Musical guests: John Legend—"All She Wanna Do"

Week 1
Running order

Week 2
Musical guests: Robbie Williams—"She's the One"

Running order

Judges' votes to save
Horwood: Matt & Nadiya
Mabuse: Matt & Nadiya
Du Beke: Matt & Nadiya
Ballas: Did not vote, but would have voted to save Kaye & Kai

Week 3: Movie Week
Musical guest: Adam Lambert—"Mad About the Boy"
Running order

Judges' votes to save
Horwood: Fleur & Vito
Mabuse: Fleur & Vito
Du Beke: Fleur & Vito
Ballas: Did not vote, but would have voted to save Richie & Giovanni

Week 4
Musical guest: George Ezra—"Dance All Over Me"
Running order

Judges' votes to save
Horwood: Kym & Graziano
Mabuse: Kym & Graziano
Du Beke: Kym & Graziano
Ballas: Did not vote, but would have voted to save Kym & Graziano

Week 5: Celebrating BBC 100 Week
Musical guest: Becky Hill—"Crazy What Love Can Do"/"My Heart Goes (La Di Da)"/"Remember"
Running order

Judges' votes to save
Horwood: Molly & Carlos
Mabuse: Molly & Carlos
Du Beke: Molly & Carlos
Ballas: Did not vote, but would have voted to save Molly & Carlos

Week 6: Halloween Week
Musical guest: Rina Sawayama—"This Hell"
Running order

Judges' votes to save
Horwood: Fleur & Vito
Mabuse: Fleur & Vito
Du Beke: Fleur & Vito
Ballas: Did not vote, but would have voted to save Fleur & Vito

Week 7
Musical guest: Luke Evans—"Bridge over Troubled Water"
Running order

Judges' votes to save
Horwood: Molly & Carlos
Mabuse: Molly & Carlos
Du Beke: Molly & Carlos
Ballas: Did not vote, but would have voted to save Molly & Carlos

Week 8
Musical guest: Sheku Kanneh-Mason & Zak Abel—"Same Boat"
Running order

Tony & Katya and Tyler & Dianne were announced as the bottom two couples. However, Tony had sustained a hamstring injury during his original performance and was unable to compete in the dance-off; he therefore withdrew from the competition.

Week 9: Blackpool Week
Musical guest: Sam Ryder—"You're The Voice" and "All The Way Over"
Running order

Judges' votes to save
Horwood: Molly & Carlos
Mabuse: Molly & Carlos
Du Beke: Tyler & Dianne
Ballas: Molly & Carlos

Week 10
Musical guest: Joel Corry & Tom Grennan—"Lionheart (Fearless)"
Running order

Due to Kym testing positive for COVID-19, Kym & Graziano were unable to perform, having been due to dance a Couple's Choice to "I Feel for You" by Chaka Khan. Under the rules of the show, they were given a bye to the following week.

Judges' votes to save
Horwood: Fleur & Vito 
Mabuse: Fleur & Vito
Du Beke: Fleur & Vito
Ballas: Did not vote, but would have voted to save Fleur & Vito

Week 11: Musicals Week (Quarter-Final)
Musical guest: The Cher Show
Running order

Judges' votes to save
Horwood: Molly & Carlos
Mabuse: Molly & Carlos
Du Beke: Kym & Graziano
Ballas: Molly & Carlos

Week 12: Semi-Final
 Musical guest: Lewis Capaldi—"Pointless"
Running order

For the Dance Off, Fleur & Vito chose to dance their Charleston, while Will & Nancy chose to dance their Couple's Choice.
Judges' votes to save
Horwood: Fleur & Vito
Mabuse: Fleur & Vito
Du Beke: Will & Nancy
Ballas: Fleur & Vito

Week 13: Final
Musical guest: Florence and the Machine—"My Love"
Running order

Dance chart
 Highest scoring dance
 Lowest scoring dance
 Not performed due to illness or injury

Week 1: American Smooth, Cha-Cha-Cha, Foxtrot, Jive, Quickstep, Samba or Tango
Week 2: One unlearned dance (introducing Charleston, Paso Doble, Salsa, Viennese Waltz & Waltz)
Week 3 (Movie Week): One unlearned dance (introducing Rumba)
Week 4: One unlearned dance (introducing Couple's Choice & Argentine Tango)
Week 5 (Celebrating BBC 100 Week): One unlearned dance
Week 6 (Halloween Week): One unlearned dance
Weeks 7 & 8: One unlearned dance
Week 9 (Blackpool Week): One unlearned dance
Week 10: One unlearned dance
Week 11 (Musicals Week): One unlearned dance
Week 12 (Semi Finals): Two unlearned dances
Week 13 (Finals): Judges' choice, showdance and couple's favourite dance

Ratings
Weekly ratings for each show on BBC One. All ratings are provided by BARB.

References

External links 
 

2022 British television seasons
Strictly Come Dancing series